The 2018–19 San Francisco Dons men's basketball team represents the University of San Francisco during the 2018–19 NCAA Division I men's basketball season. The Dons, led by third-year head coach Kyle Smith, play their home games at the War Memorial Gymnasium as members of the West Coast Conference.

Previous season
The Dons finished the 2017–18 season 22–17, 9–9 in WCC play to finish in a three-way tie for fourth place. They defeated Pacific in the quarterfinals of the WCC tournament before losing in the semifinals to Gonzaga. They were invited to the College Basketball Invitational where they defeated Colgate, Utah Valley, and Campbell to advance to the best-of-three championship series against North Texas where they won game 1 before losing game 2 and 3.

Offseason

Departures

Incoming transfers

2018 recruiting class

Roster

Schedule and results

|-
!colspan=12 style=| Non-conference regular season

|-
!colspan=12 style=| WCC regular season

|-
!colspan=9 style=| WCC tournament

Source:

References

San Francisco Dons men's basketball seasons
San Francisco
San Francisco Dons
San Francisco Dons
San Francisco Dons
San Francisco Dons